Cryptide can refer to:

Cryptid, rumored or suspected creatures for which conclusive evidence is still missing
List of cryptids
Cryptid Hunters, a 2004 novel by Roland Smith
Cryptand, a family of synthetic bi- and polycyclic multidentate ligands for a variety of cations